Events from the year 1827 in France.

Incumbents
 Monarch – Charles X
 Prime Minister – Joseph de Villèle

Events
April - Ottoman Algeria: Husain Dei slaps the French consul, Decalina, on the face, eventually leading to war and French rule in Algeria.
6 July - Treaty of London, signed by the United Kingdom, France, and Russia calling upon Greece and the Ottoman Empire to cease hostilities.
20 October - Battle of Navarino, combined British, French and Russian naval force destroyed a combined Ottoman and Egyptian armada.
17 November - Legislative Election held for the third legislature of the Second Restoration.
24 November - Legislative Election held

Births

January to June
1 February - Alphonse James de Rothschild, banker and philanthropist (died 1905)
1 May - Jules Adolphe Aimé Louis Breton, painter (died 1906)
11 May - Jean-Baptiste Carpeaux, sculptor and painter (died 1875)
19 May - Paul-Armand Challemel-Lacour, statesman (died 1896)
1 June - Charles Émile Freppel, Bishop and politician (died 1891)
24 June - Louis Brière de l'Isle, Military officer and colonial governor (died 1897)

July to September
11 July - Paul Bins, comte de Saint-Victor, author (died 1881)
12 July - Henri Rivière, Naval officer and writer (died 1883)
29 July - Louis Ratisbonne, writer and man of letters (died 1900)
16 September - Jean Albert Gaudry, geologist and palaeontologist (died 1908)
27 September - Pierre Tirard, politician (died 1893)

October to December
8 October - Francisque Sarcey, journalist and drama critic (died 1899)
25 October - Marcellin Berthelot, chemist and politician (died 1907)
1 November - Pierre Adolphe Adrien Doyon, dermatologist (died 1907)
30 November - Henri Ernest Baillon, botanist and physician (died 1895)
5 December - Marie Henri d'Arbois de Jubainville, historian and philologist (died 1910)
7 December - Marc Monnier, writer (died 1885)
9 December - Joseph-Christian-Ernest Bourret, Cardinal (died 1896)
10 December - Jacques-Marie-Louis Monsabré, priest and orator (died 1907)
26 December - Étienne Léopold Trouvelot, artist, astronomer and amateur entomologist, introduced the Gypsy Moth into North America (died 1895)

Full date unknown
Auguste Chauveau, professor and veterinarian (died 1917)
Jean Antoine Villemin, physician (died 1892)

Deaths

January to June
13 January - Jean Denis, comte Lanjuinais, politician, lawyer, jurist, journalist and historian (born 1753)
15 January - Michel Mathieu Lecointe-Puyraveau, politician (born 1764)
30 January - Victor Marie du Pont, diplomat, then businessman in America (born 1767)
19 February - Armand Augustin Louis de Caulaincourt, General and diplomat (born 1773)
5 March - Pierre-Simon Laplace, mathematician and astronomer (born 1749)
5 March - Charles du Houx de Viomesnil, Marshal of France (born 1734)
27 March - François Alexandre Frédéric, duc de la Rochefoucauld-Liancourt, social reformer (born 1747)
6 May - François-Frédéric Lemot, sculptor (born 1772)
31 May - Pierre Louis Prieur, politician (born 1756)

July to December
14 July - Augustin-Jean Fresnel, physicist (born 1788)
9 August - Marc-Antoine Madeleine Désaugiers, composer, dramatist and songwriter (born 1772)
20 August - Jacques-Antoine Manuel, politician and orator (born 1775)
13 September - Joseph-Geneviève de Puisaye, aristocrat (born 1755)

Full date unknown
Jean-Nicolas Curély, Cavalry leader (born 1774)

See also

References

1820s in France